Antoine Bouchard (born August 24, 1994 in Jonquière, Quebec)  is a Canadian judoka who competes in the men's 66 kg category. He has been ranked in the world's top 10.

In June 2016, he was named to Canada's Olympic team.

See also
 Judo in Quebec
 Judo in Canada
 List of Canadian judoka

References

External links
 

Canadian male judoka
1994 births
Living people
Sportspeople from Saguenay, Quebec
Judoka at the 2015 Pan American Games
Pan American Games silver medalists for Canada
Judoka at the 2016 Summer Olympics
Olympic judoka of Canada
Judoka at the 2014 Commonwealth Games
Pan American Games medalists in judo
Medalists at the 2015 Pan American Games
Commonwealth Games competitors for Canada
21st-century Canadian people